The 40th government of Turkey (21 June 1977 – 21 July 1977) was a short term (one month) government that governed Turkey in 1977. It was a minority government of Republican People's Party (CHP) led by Bülent Ecevit.

The elections
In the elections held on 5 June 1977, CHP received 41% (highest percentage CHP ever reached after 1950) of the vote and became the first party. However, in the parliament, CHP gained only 213 seats out of 450. Other parties were reluctant to form a coalition with CHP. However, Ecevit, confident of his prestige, tried a minority government.

The government

Aftermath
In the voting on 21 July, the government lost a vote of confidence (217 vs 229).

References

Republican People's Party (Turkey) politicians
Cabinets of Turkey
1977 establishments in Turkey
Minority governments
1977 disestablishments in Turkey
Cabinets established in 1977
Cabinets disestablished in 1977
Members of the 40th government of Turkey
16th parliament of Turkey
Republican People's Party (Turkey)